Two male athletes from Mauritius competed at the 1996 Summer Paralympics in Atlanta, United States.

See also
Mauritius at the Paralympics
Mauritius at the 1996 Summer Olympics

References 

Nations at the 1996 Summer Paralympics
1996
Paralympics